Women in Niue are the female residents of or women who are from Niue. In terms of division of labor, the women of Niue inherits the tasks that belong to the domestic domain, including caring for children and elder members of the family unit, preparation and cooking of meals, sewing and weaving. Niuean women have "some rights" in relation to land tenure and inheritance of real property, but such rights are not "as strong" as those that belong to the men of Niue. Women in Niue over the age of 18 can vote in politics; they can vote in the so-called "second vote" level to elect 6 "island-wide representatives" known as members of the "Common Roll" (only men can vote to elect a village representative – a voting level known as the "first vote"). There is a trade union composed of women's groups in Niue. As women get older, Niuean women become more influential by taking up "positions of authority" after being educated and by demonstrating having qualities of an effective leader.

See also 
 Niuean women in politics
 Music of Niue
 Demographics of Niue

References

External links 

 
Niue